This is a non-exhaustive list of Australian Football League players of Māori descent, an ethnic group from New Zealand.

Australian Football League

 Paul Bower
 Greg Broughton
 Danny Dickfos
 Donald Dickie
 Moana Hope
 Dustin Martin
 Daniel McAlister
 Brett Peake
 Brian Peake
 Shane Savage
 Wayne Schwass
 Marley Williams

See also 
 List of VFL/AFL players with international backgrounds
 List of New Zealand Māori sportspeople

References 

AFL
!
New Zealand Maori
New Zealand Maori
Maori AFL